Samuel Zayas (born 16 February 1987) is a Dominican footballer who plays as a forward for Cibao FC and the Dominican Republic national team.

International career
Zayas made his international debut on 30 August 2014, when he was a starter in a lost friendly against El Salvador.

International goals
Scores and results list Dominican Republic's goal tally first.

References

1987 births
Living people
Sportspeople from Santo Domingo
Dominican Republic footballers
FC Solothurn players
FC Grenchen players
Liga Dominicana de Fútbol players
Cibao FC players
Dominican Republic international footballers
Dominican Republic expatriate footballers
Dominican Republic expatriate sportspeople in Switzerland
Expatriate footballers in Switzerland
Association football forwards
Association football midfielders